The IIHF World Junior Championship is an annual event organized by the International Ice Hockey Federation for national under-20 ice hockey teams from around the world.  The 'Top Division' features the top ten ranked hockey nations in the world.  After each tournament, the media covering the tournament select a five-man All-Star Team consisting of three forwards, two defencemen and one goalie. Players named to the team, along with the countries they represent are shown below from the first official tournament (1977) until present.

References

World Junior Ice Hockey Championships